Grafton Apparel Ltd. is a leading Canadian seller of men's apparel.  Grafton Apparel Ltd. operates through its retail chains, Tip Top Tailors, George Richards Big and Tall,  Mr. Big & Tall, and Kingsport Clothiers, which are located coast to coast in Canada. The company's leading competitor is Men's Wearhouse's Moores.

History
In 1853, James Beatty Grafton, son of Irish immigrants, left school at the age of 16 to become an apprentice in the dry goods industry.  Moving later that year to Dundas, Ontario, he went into business with Anthony Gregson and opened a dry goods, millinery and clothing shop known as Gregson & Grafton.  The company was established later that year, fourteen years before Canadian Confederation.  In 1858 Anthony Gregson retired and James Grafton was joined in business by his brother John to form the J.B. & J.S. Grafton Co.  In 1884, James John Grafton, the son of James Beatty Grafton joined the company as a full partner and the company was once again renamed to Grafton & Co.  In 1889 the store was ready to expand and opened its second branch in Owen Sound, Ontario.  Within the next 16 years five more branches opened in southern Ontario in Peterborough, Hamilton, London, Brantford and Woodstock.

In 1900 Grafton & Co. opened a factory across the street from its original store in Dundas to ensure that all the products they offered were manufactured with their trademark "High Grade".

By the 1960s Grafton & Co. was a well known name in Ontario with eight stores around the province.  On July 19, 1967 Grafton & Co. purchased Jack Fraser Stores Limited and became Grafton-Fraser Limited.  The middle of the line pricing and well established quality of the clothing offered at both of these stores made for the perfect partnership between the companies.

Jack Fraser had been founded in 1926 by Jack Fraser in Toronto's east-end.  The store was quickly established for its superior value to the customer.  By the 1950s the chain had 17 stores across south-central Ontario.  Jack Fraser offered its selection in the Boys and Menswear departments at Woolco stores, giving it coast to coast exposure, in addition to its own 23 Jack Fraser stores, located principally in shopping centres.

In the late 1960s, after the merger, the decision was made to expand Jack Fraser from Ontario to across Canada, while continuing to expand with Woolco in their Menswear department.  The expansion started in 1969 was completed by 1976 with the establishment of their 80th store.  At this time Jack Fraser stores were found in every province.

1977 saw the next merger for Grafton-Fraser when they purchased George Richards Kingsize Clothes Limited, Canada's largest chain of specialty apparel for big and tall men.

In the early 1980s, Grafton-Fraser also operated the Dapper Dan chain of jeans and casual clothing stores, competing head on with Dylex's Thrifty's chain.  Dapper Dan operated stores with a colour scheme and signage font very close to today's The Gap stores.  In 1984, Grafton-Fraser launched its Grafton & Co. Store which was an upscale menswear specialty retailer featuring high fashion sportswear and casual clothing.

Faced with the recession of the early 1990s, Grafton-Fraser was forced to re-evaluate its operational strategy, reinventing itself centered on its key strength in the men's apparel market.  The company divested itself of all footwear operations as well as home furnishings, business, women's departments, children departments and leased department activities (such as Woolco), as well as all non-Canadian enterprises launched during the late '70s and early '80s.

Emerging from reorganization in 1992 as a leaner but stronger company, Grafton-Fraser was composed of three complementary chains of retail stores: Grafton & Co., Jack Fraser Menswear and George Richards Big & Tall Menswear.  The company underwent major changes with the majority of shares being sold to the Cadillac Fairview Corporation and the addition of new President & CEO, Glenn Stonehouse.  In 1994, Stonehouse was able to buy a majority of shares from the Cadillac Fairview Corporation.

Recent history

In 1999 the company continued to expand, buying the Canadian operations of Repp Ltd. Big and Tall stores from the bankrupt Edison Brothers Stores of St. Louis, Missouri. The purchase marked the repatriation of a chain which was started by Canadians.  The chain was repositioned slightly to complement the merchandise mix of George Richards.  It was re-branded Mr. Big & Tall in a large media campaign in the fall of 1999, returning to its original name.

Later that same year Grafton-Fraser struck an agreement with Timberland retail stores.  This partnership led to Grafton-Fraser being the franchise operator of Timberland-branded retail stores.  The company was quick to open two new flagship Timberland stores which are recognized for both their footwear and clothing selection. The division peaked at nine stores in very short order.

The year 2000 saw the largest acquisition of all.  Grafton-Fraser bought the Tip Top Tailors chain from Dylex Ltd. in July of that year.  Overnight, the size of the Company doubled to over 200 stores and approximately $200 million in revenue.

The Tip Top Tailors chain was started in Toronto in 1909 by David Dunkelman in Toronto. The rented store was at 245 Yonge Street, and Dunkelman sold tailored suits for $14. The name of the chain was chosen by a customer in a contest. Originally, Tip Top Tailors sold tailored suits, and this continued up until the 1960s. Tip Top made its own merchandise. In 1929, it built a large building near the Toronto waterfront to house all its operations, including administration and manufacturing. During the Second World War, it made uniforms for many allied armed forces.

The Company also acquired the Kingsport Clothiers store.

In 2005, the Company made the decision to retire the Jack Fraser name and rename all Jack Fraser stores Tip Top Tailors, finding that the Tip Top Tailors name was more recognizable.  In cities where both a Jack Fraser and a Tip Top Tailors were present, the more profitable of the two stores stayed open and, where necessary, changed its name to Tip Top Tailors.  Today there are over 100 Tip Top Tailors across Canada in all provinces except Quebec and Prince Edward Island.

In 2006 July, the federal Competition Bureau announced that it had reached an agreement with Grafton-Fraser and its President resolving the Bureau's concerns over the company's pricing practices. The Bureau alleged that Grafton-Fraser tagged these garments with both a regular and a sale price when, in fact, the garments were not sold in any significant quantity or for any reasonable period of time at the regular price. Among other things, the Agreement called for the payment of an administrative monetary penalty and costs totalling $1.2 million.

Change continued for Grafton-Fraser. In 2007 May, majority ownership of the company was sold to an affiliate of Gordon Brothers Group. The Timberland division was closed during 2007 and 2008. The Grafton & Co. chain was merged with the Stonehouse Menswear, and all those stores were rebranded under the Stonehouse Menswear brand. This retail chain was closed in 2010, with all Stonehouse stores closed in that year. The merchandise brand Stonehouse was continued in Tip Top Tailors.

Tip Top Tailors, Kingsport Clothiers, Mr. Big and Tall and George Richards chains continue to operate in most provinces across Canada and make up well over 150 stores for Grafton-Fraser Inc.

References

External links

Tip Top Tailors official website
George Richards official website
Mr. Big & Tall official website

Clothing retailers of Canada
Retail companies established in 1853